Combat Outpost Keating was a small American military outpost in Nurestan Province, in Afghanistan. Plans were drawn up in the summer of 2006 by the US Army's 10th Mountain Division as part of Operation Mountain Lion. Combat Outpost Keating is best known as the setting of the Battle of Kamdesh which occurred on October 3rd, 2009.

After an attack on October 3, 2009, where the base was nearly overrun, and 8 Americans and 4 Afghan defenders were killed, the base was abandoned and demolished by a bombing from an American B-1 bomber on the night of October 6th, 2009. A day after, on October 7, Taliban fighters were seen among the ruins of the outpost. According to army records, the Taliban commander of the attack on Keating, Abdul Rahman Mustaghni, was killed by the following drone strike along with thirteen other insurgents. Two Americans, Staff Sergeants Clinton L. Romesha and (then Specialist) Ty Carter were awarded the Medal of Honor for their role in defending the base.

The U.S. soldiers killed in the battle were: 
 SSG Justin T. Gallegos (Tucson, Arizona), aged 27
 SGT Christopher Griffin (Kincheloe, Michigan), aged 24
 PFC Kevin C. Thomson (Reno, Nevada), aged 21
 SGT Michael P. Scusa (Villas, New Jersey), aged 22
 SSG Vernon W. Martin (Savannah, Georgia), aged 25
 SPC Stephan L. Mace (Lovettsville, Virginia), aged 21
 SGT Joshua J. Kirk (South Portland, Maine), aged 30
 SGT Joshua M. Hardt (Applegate, California), aged 24

Amy Davidson Sorkin, writing in The New Yorker, tried to answer the question why the base had not been moved, when it was found to be unsuitable. She noted two claims the military put forward in its report: first, the resources to relocate the base had not been available because the brigade was concentrating on guarding a village that Hamid Karzai, president of Afghanistan, considered strategically important. Second, the search for Bowe Bergdahl, in June 2009, had used up so many resources none were available to address the base's unsuitable location.

In media
In May 2016 CBS News profiled Staff Sergeant Romesha, after he published an account of his experiences at the base, entitled Red Platoon: A True Story of American Valor. Romesha was critical of the choice of site for the base, describing it as "like being in a fishbowl or fighting from the bottom of a paper cup."

On November 9, 2018, the Netflix series Medal of Honor featured two separate episodes for both Romesha and Carter's personal accounts of the events that took place at COP Keating during the Battle of Kamdesh.

The films The Outpost and Red Platoon are based on the events that occurred in the Battle of Kamdesh. The former of which is based on the book The Outpost: An Untold Story of American Valor by journalist Jake Tapper.

See also
 List of post-Vietnam War Medal of Honor recipients

References

Military installations of the United States in Afghanistan